59 Persei is a suspected astrometric binary star system in the northern constellation of Perseus. It is visible to the naked eye as a dim, white-hued star with an apparent magnitude of 5.30. The star is located around 256 light years distant from the Sun, based on parallax, and is drifting further away with a radial velocity of +13 km/s.

This is an ordinary A-type main-sequence star with a stellar classification of A1Vn, a star that is fusing its core hydrogen. The 'n' suffix indicates "nebulous" lines due to rapid spin; it has a projected rotational velocity of 212 km/s. The star is around 198 million years old with 2.58 times the mass of the Sun and about 2.5 times the Sun's radius. It is radiating 41 times the luminosity of the Sun from its photosphere at an effective temperature of 10,734 K.

References

A-type main-sequence stars
Astrometric binaries

Perseus (constellation)
Durchmusterung objects
Persei, 59
029722
021928
1494